Withaferin A is a steroidal lactone, derived from Acnistus arborescens, Withania somnifera (Indian Winter cherry or Bharatiya Ashwagandha in Sanskrit) and other members of family Solanaceae. It has been traditionally used in ayurvedic medicine. It is the first member of the withanolide class of ergostane type product to be discovered. This natural product has wide range of pharmacological activities including cardioprotective, anti-inflammatory, immuno-modulatory, anti-angiogenesis, anti-metastasis and anti-carcinogenic properties.

Structure 
Withanolides are a group of naturally occurring C28- steroidal lactones. They contain four cycloalkane ring structures, three cyclohexane rings and one cyclopentane ring. Withaferin A is highly reactive because of the ketone-containing unsaturated A ring, the epoxide in the B ring, and the unsaturated lactone ring. The double bond in ring A and the epoxide ring are mainly responsible for the cytotoxicity. The 22nd and 26th carbons of the ergostane skeleton in withaferin A and related steroidal compounds are oxidized to form a six-membered delta lactone unit. NMR spectral analysis identifies C3 in the unsaturated A ring as the main nucleophilic target site for ethyl mercaptan, thiophenol and L-cysteine ethyl ester in vitro. A library of 2, 3-dihydro-3β-substituted derivatives are synthesized by regio/stereoselective Michael addition to ring A. These analogs are being tested for its activity in neuro-degenerative diseases, autoimmune and inflammatory diseases and in cancer.

Regulation  
3-azido withaferin A (3-azidoWA), a stable derivative of withaferin A, has been shown to inhibit cancer cell motility and invasion in wound healing by selectively suppressing MMP-2 activity in human cervical and prostate cell lines. It enhances the secretion of Par-4 which in turn suppresses MMP-2 expression and activity that is required for tumor metastasis. 3-azidoWA acts as a tumor suppressor by inducing Par-4, TIMP-1 and by reducing the levels of pAkt and pERK that are activated in various cancers. This finding has augmented the therapeutic potential of the pro-apoptotic protein Par-4 in cancer. Researchers have shown that 3-azidoWA abrogated neovascularisation in vivo in a dose-dependent manner.

Withaferin A has been shown to inhibit cell proliferation in HUVECs at significantly lower doses through the inhibition of Cyclin D1 expression. Inhibition of cell proliferation is due to the cytostatic nature of withaferin, resulting in cell arrest in the G0G1 phase of the cell cycle. Researchers have shown that withaferin A has an anti-angiogenic activity in vivo at doses much lower than required for its anti-tumor activity.

Regulation of transcription factor NF-κB 
NF-κB is a transcription factor that regulates many genes involved in cell survival, growth, immune response and angiogenesis. Withaferin A inhibits NF-κB at a very low concentration by targeting the ubiquitin-mediated proteasome pathway (UPP) in endothelial cells. Scientists believe that the site at which withaferin acts on UPP must be different from the site of action of 20s proteasome inhibitor. In vitro experiments demonstrated that withaferin A interferes with TNF-induced NF-κB activation at the level or upstream of IKKβ. It also inhibits other transcription factors including Ap1 and Sp1 which are important mediators of many signalling pathways that are down-regulated by various chemotherapeutic agents. It can induce oxidative stress, alter gene expression, depolarize mitochondria. Withaferin A also down regulates VEGF gene expression and can affect calcium signaling. Mohan et al. showed that withaferin A could inhibit endothelial cell proliferation at low concentrations and thus non-toxic to cells.

Regulation of heat shock proteins 
Researchers have demonstrated the regulation of Hsp90 co-chaperone CDC37 through direct irreversible binding of withaferin A to C-terminus of Hsp90. Withaferin induces aggregation of Hsp90, dissociation of Hsp90- CDC37 complex and down regulation of Hsp90 target proteins mediated through proteasomal degradation. Induction of heat shock response by withaferin provides cytoprotective property whereas inhibition of heat shock protein activity will lead to apoptosis. This dual property of withaferin on heat shock protein might be due to the concentration of withaferin and cellular content.

Properties

Anti-inflammatory 
Withania extracts suppresses the production of various pro-inflammatory molecules in many in vitro models. Anti-inflammatory property of withaferin A has been attributed to its ability to suppress alpha-2 macroglobulin, NF-κB and AP1. Several withanolides selective inhibition of enzyme cyclooxygenase-2 (COX-2) that increases during inflammation.

Anti-tumor 
The anti-tumor activity of withaferin A was tested on human prostate cancer cell line, PC-3 and confirmed in PC-3 xenografts in nude mice. It exhibits androgen receptor (AR) dependent cytotoxicity. It inhibits tumor growth through ATP- independent inhibition of heat shock protein 90 (HSP90) in in vivo pancreatic model. It exhibits growth- inhibitory properties in cancer cell culture experiments, suggesting its cytotoxic and apoptotic properties. It increases Mcl-1 expression levels inducing apoptosis in vitro breast cancer models. It binds to intermediate filament protein, vimentin by covalently modifying its highly conserved cysteine residue in alpha-helical coiled 2B domain. Withaferin A causes aggregation of vimentin to colocalize with F-actin leading to apoptosis.

Immunosuppressive 
Shohat et al., have demonstrated specific immunosuppressive effects on mouse thymocytes as well as human B and T lymphocytes by withaferin A and a related steroid lactone withanolide E. At very low concentrations, these molecules inhibit the E rosette and EAC rosette formation by normal B and T lymphocytes. Withaferin A has a specific action on antigen recognition and proliferative capacity of both B and T lymphocytes. A recent study had elaborated the role of Withaferin in inhibition of Zap70 kinase activity, which is critical for T-cell function in health and disease.

Cell motility and invasion 
Withaferin A inhibits cell motility and invasion capacity of cancer cells through MMP-2 by induction of Par-4. Since a critical event in cancer metastasis is the ability of these cells to invade the extracellular matrix (ECM), inhibition of invasive property by withaferin can contain the cancer cells to primary site. Colony forming ability of cancer cells were attenuated by withaferin derivative in a dose dependent manner. Actin is required for various cellular processes including oriented growth, adhesion and migration. Withaferin A can alter cytoskeleton architecture by covalently binding to multifunctional adaptor protein annexin II and by stimulating the basal F-actin cross linking activity.

Anti-angiogenesis 
It is a potent inhibitor of angiogenesis. Anti-angiogenic and anti-tumor activity of withaferin A is due to the inhibition of chymotrypsin whereas the induction of apoptosis is due to the inhibition of protein kinase C. Caspase-3 activation by withaferin A has also been reported.

Clinical relevance

Cancer 
Cervical cancer is caused by human papilloma virus (HPV) expressing E6 and E7 oncoproteins, which inactivate the tumor suppressor protein p53 and pRb respectively. Withaferin A was found to down regulate expression of E6 and E7 oncoproteins, induce accumulation of p53, causes G2/M cell cycle arrest, alters the expression levels of apoptotic markers Bcl2, Bax and caspase3. In athymic mice model, withaferin reduced 70% of the tumor volume. Therefore, withaferin A can be a potential therapeutic agent for the treatment of cervical cancer without major side effects. Withaferin A has been shown to enhance radiation-induced apoptosis in certain cell lines. However, its mechanism of action on cell death is not well understood. It has been suggested that sensitization of cancer cells to radiation is due to the inhibition of NF-κB. It exhibits anti-tumor as well as anti-inflammatory activities. It can act as an immuno-suppressant by inhibiting NF-κB activation. In animal models, it prevented skin cancer induced by ultraviolet radiation. The antioxidant property of withaferin aid in the prevention of DNA damage by mutagens; in combination with detoxifying, anti-inflammatory and immunomodulatory effects, it can contribute to the chemopreventive action.

Withaferin A binds to and inhibits vimentin preventing breast cancer cell growth both in vitro and in vivo. It increases the phosphorylation of JNK, ERK and MAPK in vitro breast cancer models. It increases the expression of tumor suppressor p53, Notch 2 and Notch 4, down-regulates the expression of ERα, resulting in the inhibition of cancer cell migration and growth. Notch signaling plays a significant role in the development of colon cancer, therefore targeting the Notch pathway by withaferin A can be a potential therapeutic option in treating colon cancer. Koduru et al., demonstrated that the inhibition of Notch- mediated prosurvival by withaferin A facilitates c-Jun-NH2-kinase-mediated apoptosis in colon cancer cell lines.  Withaferin A downregulates vimentin expression leading to structural perturbation of intermediary filaments. Cancer cells express enhanced vimentin expression and correlates with the induction of epithelial to mesenchymal transition (EMT), metastasis, poor prognosis and decreased survival rate. Further, caspase-dependent degradation of vimentin by withaferin A was observed. Combining various properties like anti-inflammatory, pro-apoptotic, anti-angiogenic and antiproliferation makes withaferin A a potential drug candidate for treatment of cancer. Studies in animal models has shown promising results for breast cancer, pancreatic cancer, cervical cancer, lung cancer, medullary thyroid cancer among others.

Other diseases 
Sen et al., have demonstrated that in Leishmania donovani, withaferin A inhibits PKC resulting in depolarization of Delta Psi(m) and generation of reactive oxygen species in the cell. Depolarization leads to the release of cytochrome c and activation of caspase-likeprotease and DNA fragmentation, finally leading to apoptosis. Animal and in vitro studies have shown antibacterial effects against Staphylococcus aureus, Listeria monocytogenes, Bacillus anthracis, Bacillus subtilis, Salmonella enteriditis and Salmonella typhimurium. Withania roots have demonstrated chondroprotective effects in vitro arthritis model. The herb is also used in treatment of iron-deficiency anemia due to its effects on haematopoiesis and natural iron content. Withaferin A is also used in the treatment of Metabolic syndrome [20].

Biosynthesis 

In the withania somnifera plant, the withanolide, Withaferin A, is present in the leaves. Withanolides are terpenoids, which are synthesized in plants using isoprenoids as precursors. Isoprenoids can be synthesized through mevalonate or 1-deoxy-D-xylulose 5-phosphate pathways. Isoprenogenesis significantly governs withanolide synthesis.

Isoprenoids form squalene, which then goes through a variety of intermediate steps to form 24-methylenecholesterol - the sterol precursor of the withanolides.

The biosynthesis of Withaferin A utilizes a variety of enzymes such as squalene epoxidase (SQE), cycloartenol synthase (CAS), sterol methyl transferase (SMT), obtusifoliol-14 –demethylase (ODM). Upregulation of expression of these key enzymes could potentially enhance Withaferin A content in the leaves.

To produce Withaferin A from 24-methylene cholesterol, the molecule undergoes several functional changes including formation of a ketone, epoxide, 2 hydroxyl groups, and lactone ring.

Interaction 
Par-4

Hsp90

Vimentin

NF-κB

Annexin II

Caspase-3

p53

Zap70

See also 
 Withanolide
 Vinblastine
 Vincristine
 Taxol
 Turmeric

References

Further reading

External links 
 https://pubchem.ncbi.nlm.nih.gov/compound/Withaferin_A
 http://www.ebi.ac.uk/chebi/searchId.do?chebiId=CHEBI%3A69120
 http://www.withaferina.com/
 http://www.xenonbio.com/

Steroids
Epoxides
Lactones